Ski-U-Mah (pronounced sky-you-ma), was the college humor magazine of the University of Minnesota (and named for a U. of M. sports cheer) from about early 1920s to 1950. The magazine was affiliated to the Sigma Delta Chi fraternity in the university. It was modeled on Harvard Lampoon.

Its most prominent writer was Max Shulman, who later wrote the stories that became the television program The Many Loves of Dobie Gillis.

References

Shulman, Max, Max Shulman's Guided Tour of Campus Humor, Hanover House, Garden City, New York, 1955.

Student magazines published in the United States
College humor magazines
Defunct magazines published in the United States
Magazines published in Minnesota
Magazines with year of establishment missing
Magazines disestablished in 1950
University of Minnesota
1920s establishments in Minnesota
Magazines established in the 1920s
1950 disestablishments in Minnesota